Shine is a five-song extended play by American singer-songwriter Anna Nalick, released on March 25, 2008. It is composed of the album version of "Shine", two acoustic versions of songs from her debut album ("Breathe (2 AM)" and "Wreck of the Day"), a cover version of Red Hot Chili Peppers' song "Breaking the Girl," and an acoustic version of the title track. The EP was recorded at NRG Recording in North Hollywood, California, and at SquawkBox Studio in Los Angeles, and mastered at Bernie Grundman Mastering in Hollywood.

The EP was intended to be an intro to her second album, but the album was cancelled due to a dispute with her label, Sony Music.

Track listing

Personnel 
Musicians
Anna Nalick: acoustic guitar, vocals
Bruce Watson: electric guitar, acoustic guitar
Chris Chaney bass
Eric Ivan Rosse: keyboards, programming
Brian MacLeod: drums

Production
Eric Ivan Rosse: producer, arranger, audio production, mixing, overdub engineer, vocal engineer
Brian "Big Bass" Gardner: mastering
Howard Christopher Willing: engineer, recording
Eric Taylor: assistant engineer

References

2008 EPs
Epic Records EPs
Anna Nalick albums